Perrysburg Exempted Village School District, or Perrysburg Schools, is located in Northwest Ohio, USA. The district has a total enrollment of over 5,700 students attending eight school buildings in an area of 28 square miles. Perrysburg High School was named a 2014 National Blue Ribbon School.

Perrysburg Schools is the second largest employer in the area, after Owens-Illinois. The Superintendent is Thomas L. Hosler. Perrysburg Schools are widely recognized for our excellent academic, fine and performing arts and athletic programs. Our schools are considered to be among the finest in the state. Perrysburg was graded A+ and ranked #24 in Ohio in Niche’s 2021 Suburbs with the Best Public Schools in Ohio, based on state test scores, graduation rates, SAT/ACT scores, teacher quality and student and parent reviews.
Perrysburg Schools has been named among the “Best Communities for Music Education” every year since 2007. Perrysburg High School, Perrysburg Junior High School and Hull Prairie Intermediate School have earned the Ohio Department of Education’s Purple Star designation, recognizing the schools’ commitment to serving military-connected students and families. The Class of 2021 was offered $21.8 Million in scholarship awards. Our average teacher experience is 12 years and 72% of our teachers have at least a Master’s Degree.

Students, teachers, staff members, parents and guardians work together to ensure all students possess the necessary academic and social-emotional skills to be successful in college and their careers. The school district offers a range of rigorous, innovative coursework and extracurricular activities to develop well-rounded, lifelong learners who are also active citizens in their communities. School district team members continue to look towards the future and vigilantly adapt to ensure Perrysburg remains a destination district for future generations.

Over 20 advanced placement and honors classes are offered at Perrysburg High School. The district's elementary schools have robust technology integration.

The school district serves students who live in the city of Perrysburg and parts of Perrysburg Township and Middleton Township, all in Wood County.

The mascot is the Yellow Jacket and the colors are black and gold. The sports teams are commonly referred to as the Jackets.

Grades 9-12
Perrysburg High School

Grades 7-8
Perrysburg Junior High School

Grades 5-6
Hull Prairie Intermediate School

Grades K-4
Fort Meigs Elementary
Frank Elementary
Toth Elementary
Woodland Elementary

Preschool
Perrysburg Preschool

References

External links
District website

School districts in Wood County, Ohio
1849 establishments in Ohio
School districts established in 1849
Perrysburg, Ohio